

The Buchanan BAC-204 Ozzie Mozzie is an Australian two-seat light aircraft designed and built by Buchanan Aircraft Corporation of Queensland for certification to meet JAR-VLA.

Design and development
The Ozzie Mozzie was launched in May 1987 with construction started in August 1989, the prototype registered VH-OZE first flew on 11 December 1990.

The Ozzie Mozzie has an all-composite structure and is a mid-wing cantilever monoplane with a conventional tail. The prototype is powered by an  Rotax 912-A1 flat-four piston engine. It has a fixed tricycle landing gear and an enclosed cockpit for two sitting side by side under a one-piece canopy.

Specifications

References

Notes

Bibliography

1990s Australian civil utility aircraft
Shoulder-wing aircraft
Single-engined tractor aircraft
Ozzie Mozzie